SOKO Wismar is a German police procedural television series that premiered on 6 October 2004 on ZDF. It is the fifth offshoot of SOKO München, launched in 1978 under the name SOKO 5113. "SOKO" is an abbreviation of the German word Sonderkommission, which means "special investigative team".

Synopsis
Under the leadership of First Chief Inspector Jan Reuter, Chief Inspector Lars Pöhlmann, Chief Inspector Karoline Joost, and Chief of Police Paula Moorkamp, a police team investigates criminal cases in the north German town of Wismar. Assisting the team are forensic scientist Roswitha Prinzler, Latvian exchange officer Edgars "Eddi" Jansons, and coroner Helene Sturbeck.

Production
SOKO Wismar is produced by Real Film Berlin, a subsidiary of Studio Hamburg. Filming takes place both in Wismar and its surroundings as well as in Berlin. The World Heritage Sites of Wismar's old town and its harbour often serve as filming locations.  The entrance to the police station is actually the entrance to the Hospital of the Holy Ghost. The inside of the station is filmed at Adlershof Studios, in Berlin.

Crossover
On 3 April 2013, five SOKO teams were brought together for a five-part special titled SOKO – Der Prozess. In it, the teams from Munich, Cologne, Leipzig, Stuttgart, and Wismar have to solve the murder of a police officer. The five episodes were shown across Germany from 30 September to 4 October 2013.

Cast and characters
Current

See also
 List of German television series

References

External links
 
 SOKO Wismar at ZDF

2004 German television series debuts
2010s German television series
German crime television series
2000s German police procedural television series
2010s German police procedural television series
2020s German police procedural television series
German television spin-offs
German-language television shows
ZDF original programming